is a private women's college in Matsuyama, Ehime Prefecture, Japan. The predecessor of the school was founded in 1886, and it was chartered as a university in 1992.

References

External links
 Official website 

Educational institutions established in 1886
Christian universities and colleges in Japan
Private universities and colleges in Japan
Universities and colleges in Ehime Prefecture
Women's universities and colleges in Japan
Japanese junior colleges
1886 establishments in Japan
Matsuyama, Ehime